Helen Eustis (1916-2015) was an American mystery writer and translator.  She was born in Cincinnati.  She studied art at Smith College and was awarded the Mystery Writers of America's Edgar Award in 1947 for her novel, The Horizontal Man.

Partial bibliography

Novels
The Horizontal Man (1946) 
The Fool Killer (1954)

Short stories
The Captains and the Kings Depart (1949) 
"The Rider on a Pale Horse" (1950), later republished as "Mr. Death and the Redheaded Woman" in Timeless Stories for Today and Tomorrow

References

2015 deaths
20th-century American novelists
1916 births
20th-century American women writers
American women novelists
American mystery writers
Women mystery writers
Writers from Cincinnati
Novelists from Ohio
20th-century American translators
Smith College alumni
Edgar Award winners
21st-century American women